Claude de La Trémoille, 2nd Duke of Thouars (1566 – 25 October 1604) was a sixteenth-century French nobleman of the La Tremoille family.  He was the son of Louis III de La Trémoille and his wife, Jeanne de Montmorency.

King Henry IV of France had been friendly with La Trémoille when he was King of Navarre, but kept him in a subordinate position once he became King of France, preferring La Trémoille's cousin, Henry de La Tour d'Auvergne, the Viscount of Turenne.  In 1587, La Trémoille converted to Protestantism.  He fought for Henry IV at the battle of Coutras and also at Ivry, and was rewarded by elevation to the peerage, as Duke of Thouars, in 1595.  This new title, however, made La Trémoille lose more money than it earned him.  In 1598, Turenne proposed to his sister-in-law Charlotte-Brabantine to marry La Trémoille.  Thanks to her relations with the houses of Orange and Bouillon, Charlotte-Brabantine played an important part in the French Protestant diplomacy. They had four children: Henry (1598–1674); Charlotte (1599–1664), who married James Stanley, Earl of Derby; Élisabeth (1601–1604) and Frédéric (1602–1642) comte de Laval.

In 1602, Charlotte-Brabantine dissuaded her husband from engaging in the conspiracy of Biron and encouraged him to lend allegiance to the king.  He died in 1604.

References

 Madeleine Marie Louise Saint-René Taillandier: Henry IV The Huguenot on the throne of France. Hugendubel, Munich 2004, .
 William A. Weary: The House of La Tremoille, Fifteenth through Eighteenth Centuries. Change and Adaptation in a French Noble Family. In: The Journal of Modern History . Vol. 49, No. 1, The University of Chicago Press, 1977.

1566 births
1604 deaths
Converts to Calvinism from Roman Catholicism
French Protestants
Claude
Dukes of Thouars
16th-century French people
17th-century French people
People of Byzantine descent
16th-century peers of France
17th-century peers of France
Peers created by Henry IV of France